Nebria shibanaii sakagutii is a subspecies of ground beetle in the Nebriinae subfamily that is endemic to Japan.

References

shibanaii sakagutii
Beetles described in 1957
Beetles of Asia
Endemic fauna of Japan